Stadion am Brentanobad is a multi-use stadium in Frankfurt, Germany.  It is currently used mostly for football matches and is the home stadium of 1. FFC Frankfurt and Rot-Weiß Frankfurt. The stadium has a capacity of 5,500 places.

Rot-Weiss Frankfurt
Football venues in Frankfurt
1. FFC Frankfurt
Buildings and structures in Frankfurt